Adams Township is one of the thirteen townships of Clinton County, Ohio, United States. As of the 2010 census the population was 2,091.

Geography
Located in the western part of the county, it borders the following townships:
Chester Township - north
Union Township - east
Washington Township - southeast corner
Vernon Township - south
Washington Township, Warren County - southwest
Massie Township, Warren County - west
No municipalities are located in Adams Township, but it does contain the unincorporated communities of Ogden and Sligo.

Name and history
Named for President John Quincy Adams, it is one of ten Adams Townships statewide.

It was created by the Clinton County Commissioners in 1849 from parts of Chester, Vernon, and Union townships.

Transportation
Major highways include Interstate 71, the 3C Highway (combined U.S. Route 22 and Ohio State Route 3), and State Route 380.

Government
The township is governed by a three-member board of trustees, who are elected in November of odd-numbered years to a four-year term beginning on the following January 1. Two are elected in the year after the presidential election and one is elected in the year before it. There is also an elected township fiscal officer, who serves a four-year term beginning on April 1 of the year after the election, which is held in November of the year before the presidential election. Vacancies in the fiscal officership or on the board of trustees are filled by the remaining trustees.

References

Further reading
Clinton County Historical Society.  Clinton County, Ohio, 1982.  Wilmington, Ohio:  The Society, 1982.
Ohio Atlas & Gazetteer.  6th ed. Yarmouth, Maine:  DeLorme, 2001.  
Ohio Secretary of State.  The Ohio municipal and township roster, 2002-2003.  Columbus, Ohio:  The Secretary, 2003.

External links
County website

Townships in Clinton County, Ohio
Populated places established in 1849
1849 establishments in Ohio
Townships in Ohio